The men's 50 metres hurdles event at the 1972 European Athletics Indoor Championships was held on 12 March in Grenoble.

Medalists

Results

Heats
First 3 from each heat (Q) qualified directly for the semifinals.

Semifinals
First 3 from each heat (Q) qualified directly for the final.

Final

References

60 metres hurdles at the European Athletics Indoor Championships
50